Century Mile Racetrack and Casino is a casino and horse racing facility in Leduc County, Alberta, next to the Edmonton International Airport. It is one of two "A-level" horse racing venues in the province of Alberta, and the only one-mile racetrack in western Canada.

Century Mile opened on April 1, 2019, serving as the replacement for Northlands Park. Public transit to the facility is offered via Edmonton Transit Service route 747 to the airport, and Leduc Transit route 10 (connecting via Edmonton International Airport).

History 
In February 2016, Northlands announced that racing would end at Northlands Park after the 2016 season, following 116 years of operation. As part of its "Northlands Vision 2020" proposals, Northlands had the redevelopment of Northlands Park as an "urban festival site" capable of hosting large-scale outdoor events. The organization projected it would no longer be "financially viable" once the Edmonton Oilers' new downtown arena Rogers Place opens, as it would attract the majority of major indoor events previously held at the Northlands-operated Rexall Place.

Horse Racing Alberta stated that it would pursue a new venue in the region, and stated that "Obviously we are disappointed in their decision to leave racing at Northlands Park", and that it would "work with Northlands Park as they transition out of racing to minimize the impact on our industry." In May 2016, it solicited expressions of interest for a new "A-level" track license, including from Century Casinos (who owns Alberta's other A-level circuit, Century Downs near Calgary) and Enoch Cree Nation among others. In September 2016, Horse Racing Alberta announced that it had accepted the bid by Century Casinos, which planned to build a racetrack and casino in Leduc. Century planned to build a one-mile track (in comparison to the 5/8-mile Northlands Park), which would be the only one of its kind in Western Canada. The track would inherit events formerly held at Northlands Park, including the Canadian Derby.

Horse Racing Alberta reached agreements with Northlands to continue racing at Northlands Park while the new facility was under construction. It officially opened on April 1, 2019.

Racing
The following graded stakes run at Century Mile Racetrack and Casino:

Grade III:
 Canadian Derby (2019 - Present)

The following are major events hosted at Century Mile Racetrack and Casino:
 Canadian Derby (2019 - Present)
 National Driving Championship (2022)

See also
 List of casinos in Canada

References

External links
 

Leduc County
Horse racing venues in Canada
Casinos in Alberta
Casinos completed in 2019
2019 establishments in Alberta